Taras Bulba is an historical novel by Russian-Ukrainian writer Nikolai Gogol.

Taras Bulba may also refer to:

People
Taras Bulba-Borovets (1908–1981), Ukrainian World War II resistance fighter nicknamed Taras Bulba after the Gogol character
Ion Croitoru (1963–2017), Canadian wrestler with ring name Taras Bulba

Films
Taras Bulba (1909 film), based on the Gogol novel
Taras Bulba (1924 film), based on the Gogol novel
Taras Bulba (1936 film), a 1936 French historical drama film
Taras Bulba (1962 film), based on the Gogol novel
 Taras Bulba, the Cossack, a 1962 Italian film 
Taras Bulba (2009 film), based on the Gogol novel

Music
Taras Bulba (opera), by Mykola Lysenko
Taras Bulba (rhapsody), an orchestral work by Leoš Janáček
Taras Bulba (1962 film score) by Franz Waxman

Other
Korchma Taras Bulba

See also
Bulba (disambiguation)
Taurus Bulba, a Darkwing Duck villain